Polyrhachis is a genus of formicine ants found in the Old World with over 600 species. The genus is yet to be comprehensively resolved and contains many varied species including nest-weavers (e.g. Polyrhachis dives), swimming workers (e.g. Polyrhachis sokolova), soil (e.g. Polyrhachis proxima) and tree-dwellers (e.g. Polyrhachis bicolor).

General morphology
Size: Workers range in size approx 5–10mm in length.
Eyes developed, no ocelli. Antennae have 12 segments. Antennal insertions situated far from posterior margin of clypeus.
Mesosoma of most species have spines on one or more of its pronotal, mesonotal or propodeal components. Petiole armed with spines or teeth.
First gastral tergite well developed, longer in dorsal view than exposed parts of the following terga together. Opening at gastral apex for release of venom lacking a radial fringe of hairs.

Ecology
Polyrhachis species include an array of nesting types ranging from terrestrial, soil based nests to arboreal nests. As a result, the nest architectures also vary with some species displaying a high level of complexity to nest building, utilising larval silk to weave nest materials together. Such nest weaving is more commonly associated (and indeed more complex) in ants of the genus Oecophylla.

Polyrhachis do not have a stinger but an acidipore that can spray formic acid. When attacking, this is often sprayed in combination with biting thus making the acid more effective against the subject of the attack. Polyrhachis that do not possess a metapleural gland seem to utilise the antibiotic properties of their formic acid and when it cannot be used, ants are more likely to succumb to parasite infection 

Some species are found to be social parasites of different ant genera; Polyrachis lemalidens is a good example. They live in the Korean Peninsula, China and other parts of northeastern Asia. Their nuptial flight occurs during late September to late November depending on the climate. After flight queen dealates search for host colonies. Usually Camponotus japonicus is the host but especially in Korea, their main host is Camponotus atrox. Korean antkeepers say that they even take on to Formica japonica and Camponotus quadrinotatus. Once they find a host colony, they attack small workers hanging out and 'copying' their pheromones. After doing that multiple times to multiple ants, they sneak into the nest and keep 'copying.' Then whether they hibernate or not, they eventually go to the Host Queen's chamber. Then they become tiny vampires, literally. They take onto the queen, bites its neck subduing it, sucks blood, 'Copy' pheromone. And eventually and literally cuts the neck of the host queen. This process usually lasts for 2–4 days but can last over 2 weeks. After that is much the same to other social parasites.

Other species exhibiting social parasitism include Polyrhachis lama and Polyrhachis loweryi, which intrude other ants colonies of different subfamilies, some permanently living within the host colonies.

Selected species

References

External links

Formicinae
Ant genera
Taxa named by Frederick Smith (entomologist)